Huzaifah Abdul Aziz is a Singaporean professional footballer who plays for Geylang International as a midfielder. He is the nephew of former Singapore International Malek Awab.

He was promoted from the Geylang Prime League Squad to the Senior squad in 2015 before moving to Hougang United FC in 2016.

Club career

Geylang International
He made his senior and professional debut on 28 August 2015.

Hougang United
After released by the Eagles, he joined the Hougang's revolution.

Balestier Khalsa
On 23 January, it was announced that he had signed for Balestier Khalsa for 2017 season, joining Raihan Rahman from Hougang United

Tampines Rovers 
On 8 June 2021, Huzaifah returned to Tampines Rovers after successfully recovering from his injury.

Geylang International
On 7 November 2021, it was announced that he had returned to the Eagles for the 2022 season.

International career
Huzaifah was first called up to the Singapore side in 2018 for the friendlies against Mongolia and Cambodia on 12 October and 16 October 2018 respectively.

He made his international debut against Mongolia, replacing Hariss Harun in the 90th minute.

Career statistics

Club
. Caps and goals may not be correct.

International Statistics

International caps

Statistics accurate as of match played 12 October 2018

References 

Singaporean footballers
Singapore Premier League players
1994 births
Living people
Singapore international footballers
Association football midfielders
Geylang International FC players
Balestier Khalsa FC players
Tampines Rovers FC players